Stephen Knight was a sixteenth-century English Protestant martyr. His story was recorded in Foxe's Book of Martyrs. For denying transubstantiation, he was burned to death at Maldon, Essex.

References

16th-century Protestant martyrs
16th-century executions by England
People executed for heresy
Executed British people
People executed by the Kingdom of England by burning
Year of birth unknown
People executed under Mary I of England
Protestant martyrs of England